Vladimir Antonov was a Russian architect who worked for most of his career in Kumanovo, Macedonia in the beginning of the 20th century. He was a member of the White Guardians and became a White émigré in the Kingdom of Yugoslavia. He was elected as municipal engineer in 1925 to implement the First Regulation Plan of Kumanovo from 1923.

References

People from Kumanovo
Russian architects
White Russian emigrants to Yugoslavia
Macedonian people of Russian descent